Dattatray "Datta" Padsalgikar (born 26 August 1958) is a senior Indian IPS officer of Maharashtra Cadre, who was, on 30 June 2018, named as the new Director General of Police of Maharashtra and succeeded Satish Mathur.

Career
An Indian Police Service (IPS) officer of the 1982 batch, Padsalgikar was on deputation to the central government in the Intelligence Bureau (IB) for a few years until he was named as the new Mumbai police commissioner in 30 January 2016 succeeding Ahmad Javed. He served as CP till 29 June 2018, when he was appointed as Maha DGP. On 29 October 2019, he was appointed as Deputy National Security Advisor of India.

Padsalgikar hails from a town on the Solapur-Bijapur border, Mr Padsalgikar has a master's degree in French literature from Pune. After serving initial postings as Additional Superintendent of Police in Nagpur, Karad and Nashik he was promoted and went on to serve as Superintendent of Police in Osmanabad and Satara, following which he served his first stint in the IB in the early 90s.

Padsalgikar would be the first Maharashtrian police chief of Mumbai after almost a decade, after D N Jadhav who held the office between March 2007 and February 2008.

Padsalgikar has worked as Deputy Commissioner of Police (DCP) Detection in the crime branch, DCP in Economic Offences Wing, DCP in South Mumbai (Zone 1), DCP of the Bandra-Jogeshwari stretch and Superintendent of Police in Osmanabad and Satara. In the IB, he has worked in Nagaland, New Delhi and Washington (US). Padsalgikar has said that fighting terror and ISIS will be one of his top priorities.

He is also known to be an excellent badminton player and an athlete.

Career

References

Police officers from Mumbai
1958 births
Living people